War and Love is a 2003 Indian Malayalam-language war film directed by Vinayan and starring Dileep, Prabhu, Laila, Mukesh Rishi, Kalabhavan Mani and Siddique. Captain Raju had a major accident on the sets of this film. The film was dubbed in Tamil as Kalam.

Plot
The film begins with Major Rajendran being killed by Pakistani terrorists on the Indo-Pakistan border and the war between India and Pakistan begins. The Pakistani Army led by General Jaffer Khan sends a battalion to capture a village on the Indian side of the Line of Control. The Indian Army Brigadier Nair sends the Madras Regiment to recapture the village. The Madras Regiment contains Lt.Col Sharath Chandran, Captain Gopinath, Major Prabhakar, Captain Kabir, Captain Vijayan, Havildar Kurian, Private Basheer, Naik Haneefa, Havildar Prashanthan, Naik Kunjunni, Captain Hema and Private Shankar. They recapture the village after a fierce gun battle that kills all of the Pakistani soldiers. Prabhakar and Kunjunni die during the battle. Jaffer Khan is angered by this defeat and plans to capture the entire Madras Regiment alive. He calls Colonel Mushtaq Muhammad, an ISI agent in the Indian Army, and pays him 50,000,000 rupees for capturing the Madras Regiment.

Mushtaq Muhammad hatches a plan in which all of the Madras Regiment except, Gopinath and Vijayan were captured. Gopi kills Mushtaq, but is captured by the Pakistanis. All the prisoners of war are sent to a Pakistani camp, where they get tortured. They are forced to work like slaves. Kabir, Haneefa, Kurian and Hema (Sharath's love interest) are killed by the Pakistanis. Meanwhile, the notorious Pakistani terrorist leader Mansoor Akthar arrives in the camp. Jaffer Khan's beautiful daughter Serina also arrives there. She is about to be raped by Mansoor, but Gopi kills him by dropping a big rock on the terrorist's head. Serina falls in love with Gopi while he decides to use it to save his country. Serina knows Malayalam since Jaffer Khan's father migrated from Malappuram to Pakistan during the Partition. Meanwhile, Captain Vijayan has infiltrated the Pakistani military and gets information that Pakistan is going to use nuclear weapons in the event of a lost war with India. Gopi, with the help of Serina, gains access to the defusing codes of the missile. The climax is a full war between Indian POWs freed by Vijayan and the Pakistani army. Finally, the nuclear bomb is defused by Gopi and the entire Pakistani army is killed. Jaffer Khan is killed by Sharath, who also dies from his injuries. The entire Pakistani camp is blown up and only Gopi, Serina and Vijayan survive. India wins the war and Gopi is given Param Vir Chakra on his return to India. Gopi marries Serina. The film ends with Serina chanting "Bharat Mata Ki Jai".

Cast

Box office
This film was overall a box-office bomb. The rating of the movie on IMDb as of December 2022 is 2.3/10 stars, making it one of the worst films in the Malayalam film industry. One review states that the film is "filled with senseless violence, cheap melodrama, tacky production values and over jingoism which would pit Indian army into shame", and that Vinayan should be "banned for making such an atrocious film".

References

External links
 

2003 films
2000s Malayalam-language films
Films about terrorism in India
Films based on Indo-Pakistani wars and conflicts
Indian Army in films
Military of Pakistan in films
Films directed by Vinayan